A number of ships were named Cheltenham, including – 

, built by Pallion Shipyard, Sunderland. Torpedoed and sunk in 1917
, built by Short Brothers, Sunderland as Empire Envoy, in service 1946–52

Ship names